Matthew Gerard Maiellaro (born August 17, 1966) is an American filmmaker, musician and voice actor. He is the co-creator and writer of the cult animated Adult Swim shows, Aqua Teen Hunger Force and Perfect Hair Forever, and the creator of 12 oz. Mouse. 

Prior to his work on Aqua Teen Hunger Force, Maiellaro was a producer and writer for Space Ghost Coast to Coast since the show's inception in 1994. Maiellaro met friend and future writing partner, Dave Willis, when he came on as a staff writer in 1995. The two have since made a few short independent films together, most notably the live-action short A Day Off, which follows a Michael Myers puppet and documents what he does on his day off from murder.

In 2000, Maiellaro and Willis created a spin-off from Space Ghost Coast to Coast – Aqua Teen Hunger Force. Seven years later, Maiellaro and Willis released a full-length Aqua Teen Hunger Force feature film on April 13, 2007. His writing is characterized by surreal humour and at times, a total disregard for traditional forms of storytelling.

Early life and education
He is a native of Pensacola, Florida, and a graduate of Pensacola Catholic High School.

Career
One of Maiellaro's earliest jobs was answering viewer mail for TBS in the late 1980s, where he met future Adult Swim executive Mike Lazzo (who was a program administrator for TBS at the time). Soon after, Maiellaro worked as a production assistant and assistant director on full-length feature horror films in the early 1990s, such as Darkman, Basket Case 3: The Progeny, Children of the Corn II and Hellraiser III: Hell on Earth. Some non-horror films he worked on were Kleptomania, Ring of Steel, Mr. McCallister's Cigarette Holder and Ruby in Paradise.

Voice work
Maiellaro provides the voice of Err the Mooninite, the Cybernetic Ghost of Christmas Past from the Future, and other various roles on Aqua Teen Hunger Force, as well as various characters for the other Adult Swim shows he's involved with. When voice acting on Aqua Teen Hunger Force, he is sometimes credited as "The Amazing Voice of Matt Maiellaro". Maiellaro also provided the voice for Mouse Fitzgerald, the main protagonist in his series 12 oz. Mouse. Most of the time, his voice is modified through Autotune.

In 2006, Maiellaro had a cameo as a cricket in the English dub of the anime Ergo Proxy.

In 2007, after the release of the Aqua Teen Hunger Force Colon Movie Film for Theaters, there was a fiasco between his company, the  FBI and Boston Mayor Thomas Menino regarding the Boston Mooninite which caused panic in Boston due to their LED placard designs which made Boston Police Department believe that they were bombs. Despite paying $2 million dollars for all the trouble, Matt Maiellaro and his team decided to create and then leak the "Boston" episode into the Internet because it was taken off the air by Cartoon Network and Turner Broadcasting System executives.

In 2011, Maiellaro was making Aqua Unit Patrol Squad 1 which was running into its 12th season, with season 13 being announced by him that year. The same year, he also announced that he is working on the Mad Libs movie with Appian Way Productions.

Music
Around 1999, Maiellaro and longtime friend Barry Mills formed the rock band Donnell Hubbard, whose music was later used in a few episodes of Sealab 2021 (notably the song "Fishin' Hole"). In the opening credits of Aqua Teen Hunger Force, graffiti can be seen that reads "Donnell Hubbard is a dead man".

Maiellaro also wrote the Squidbillies theme song, "Warrior Man". Mouse Fitzgerald, the protagonist from 12 oz. Mouse, can be seen playing metal guitar in several episodes, with Maiellaro providing the actual guitar riffs himself. A caricature of Maiellaro (voiced by Maiellaro) depicted as a Chinese food delivery boy holding an electric guitar appeared in the Aqua Teen Hunger Force episode "Spacegate World". In the DVD special feature, "How To Score Big Writing For Television", he is shown with a red Stratocaster-type guitar, a Steinberger electric guitar, and a goldtop Gibson Les Paul. He has also been featured in Adult Swim promotional materials playing an Epiphone EDS-1275.

Other work
Maiellaro directed the animated music video for Year Long Disaster's 2008 single "Leda Atomica", and has performed live with the band in Atlanta, Georgia.

In 2012, Maiellaro wrote and released his first graphic novel entitled Knowbodys, which centers around a family whose seemingly mundane life isn't all it that seems because the parents have the power to police the supernatural world (i.e. werewolves and poltergeists). This is one of Maiellaro's few projects that uses a traditional, non-absurd structure of writing.

In 2022, a new film from Maiellaro entitled Pastacolypse was reported to be in the works at Bento Box Entertainment and would stream exclusively on Tubi.

Filmography

References

External links

1966 births
Living people
American television writers
American male television writers
American male video game actors
American male voice actors
American rock guitarists
Showrunners
20th-century American guitarists
People from Pensacola, Florida